In Greek mythology,  Zakynthos or Zacynthus (Ancient Greek: Ζάκυνθος) was a Psophidian who became the founder of a colony in the island of Zacynthus, which derived its name from him.

Mythology 
Zacynthus was the son of the legendary Arcadian chief Dardanus by his wife Bateia, daughter of Teucer. He was the brother of Erichthonius and probably, Ilus and Idaea. Zacynthus was first man to sail across the island opposite the coast of Elis and became its first settler which was afterwards called Zakynthos after him.

Zakynthos is depicted on the flag of Zakynthos.

Notes

References 

 Dionysus of Halicarnassus, Roman Antiquities. English translation by Earnest Cary in the Loeb Classical Library, 7 volumes. Harvard University Press, 1937-1950. Online version at Bill Thayer's Web Site
Dionysius of Halicarnassus, Antiquitatum Romanarum quae supersunt, Vol I-IV. . Karl Jacoby. In Aedibus B.G. Teubneri. Leipzig. 1885. Greek text available at the Perseus Digital Library.
 Pausanias, Description of Greece with an English Translation by W.H.S. Jones, Litt.D., and H.A. Ormerod, M.A., in 4 Volumes. Cambridge, MA, Harvard University Press; London, William Heinemann Ltd. 1918. . Online version at the Perseus Digital Library
Pausanias, Graeciae Descriptio. 3 vols. Leipzig, Teubner. 1903.  Greek text available at the Perseus Digital Library.
 Stephanus of Byzantium, Stephani Byzantii Ethnicorum quae supersunt, edited by August Meineike (1790-1870), published 1849. A few entries from this important ancient handbook of place names have been translated by Brady Kiesling. Online version at the Topos Text Project.

Arcadian characters in Greek mythology
Arcadian mythology